Loharu Junction railway station is a railway station in Bhiwani district, Haryana. Its code is LHU. It serves Loharu city. The station consists of 5 platforms. Passenger, Express and Superfast trains halt here.

Trains

The following trains halt at Loharu Junction railway station in both directions:

 Sainik Express
 Sikar–Delhi Sarai Rohilla Intercity Express
 Bhagat Ki Kothi–Kamakhya Express
 Jodhpur–Delhi Sarai Rohilla Superfast Express
 Bikaner Delhi Sarai Rohilla Superfast Express
 Salasar Express
 Howrah–Bikaner Weekly Superfast Express
 Bikaner–Delhi Sarai Rohilla Intercity Express
 Sealdah-Bikaner Duronto Express

References

Railway stations in Bhiwani district
Bikaner railway division
Railway junction stations in Haryana